Ernesti is a surname. Notable people with the surname include:

Johann August Ernesti (1707–1781), German Rationalist theologian and philologist
Johann Christian Gottlieb Ernesti (1756–1802), German classical scholar
Johann Heinrich Ernesti (1652–1729), German philosopher, Lutheran theologian, Latin classicist and poet

See also 
Ernesti Rikhard Rainesalo (1864–1929), Finnish politician